Olle Eriksson (18 December 1918 – 4 January 2006) was a Swedish footballer and foremost known as manager.

Ericsson discovered Nils Liedholm and trained Björn Nordqvist and Freddie Ljungberg.

References

1918 births
2006 deaths
Swedish footballers
Swedish football managers
Halmstads BK managers
Jönköpings Södra IF managers
IS Halmia managers
Association footballers not categorized by position
Sportspeople from Västernorrland County